Catherine Bruce may refer to:

Lady Catherine Bruce of Clackmannan (1696–1791), Scottish noblewoman
Catherine Brudenell-Bruce (born 1984), English singer, also known as Bo Bruce
Catherine Wolfe Bruce (1816–1900), American philanthropist

See also
Kate Bruce (1860–1946), American actress
Katharine Bruce Glasier (1867–1950), English politician